Hexachloroethane, also known as perchloroethane is the organochlorine compound with the chemical formula . It is  white solid at room temperature with a camphor-like odor. It has been used by the military in smoke compositions, such as base-eject smoke munitions (smoke grenades).

Manufacture
Chlorination of tetrachloroethylene at 100–140 °C with the presence of ferric chloride is the most commonly used commercial production method, however several other methods exist. A high purity form can be produced in a small scale by reacting chlorine together with barium carbide. In September 1997, it was reported as no longer being produced in the United States for commercial distribution, but was produced as a by-product of industrial chlorination process.

Applications

Hexachloroethane has been used in the formulation of extreme pressure lubricants.  It has also been used as a chain transfer agent in the emulsion polymerization of propylene tetrafluoroethylene copolymer.  Hexachloroethane has been used as an anthelmintic in veterinary medicine, a rubber accelerator, a component of fungicidal and insecticidal formulations as well as a moth repellant and a plasticizer for cellulose esters.

Hexachloroethane has been used in the manufacture of degassing pellets to remove hydrogen gas bubbles from molten aluminum in aluminum foundries.  This use, as well as similar uses in magnesium, is being phased out in the European Union.

Use as smoke agent
Smoke grenades, called hexachloroethane smoke or HC smoke, utilize a mixture containing roughly equal parts of hexachloroethane and zinc oxide and approximately 6% granular aluminium. These smokes are toxic, which is attributed to the production of zinc chloride. According to Steinritz et al., "Due  to  its potential pulmonary toxicity," zinc chloride producing smoke grenades "have been discharged from the armory of most western countries (...)."

Use as a riot control agent 
HC smoke grenades, often used as smoke agents in combat, were used against protesters in Portland by Federal Protective Services and the Department of Homeland Security in Portland, Oregon during protests against police brutality. HC smoke began to be used more often by federal forces during Operation Diligent Valor. Despite numerous smoke canisters labeled "HC" being photographed by journalists and unusual levels of zinc and chloride, the two dominant combustion elements in HC smoke canisters, being found at protest locations, Rob Sperling, communications director for the Federal Protective Services denied the use of HC, claiming, "FPS doesn't have any items that contain HC." The Portland Bureau of Environmental Services requested safety data sheets from FPS regarding the use of HC smoke. The request was denied. While HC smoke has been most extensively used by FPS in Portland, Or during 2020-21 protests, police departments in other American cities, such as Milwaukee, Wi and Denver, Co have also purchased HC smoke canisters. Most documented uses of HC smoke as a riot control agent occurred in the United States, with little being known about its use by other governments.

Health effects 
Many protesters reported vomiting and a continued loss of appetite when exposed to the toxic smoke. Some have also reported changes in menstrual cycles. Despite its continued use by FPS as a riot control agent, the Department of Defense has begun to phase out the use of HC smoke after a 1994 report by the U.S. Army Biomedical Research and Development Laboratory due to ensure the safety of US soldiers, noting that, "Exposure of unprotected soldiers to high concentrations of HC smoke for even a few minutes has resulted in injuries and fatalities." While HC related injuries have been common in Portland, Or, no deaths due to the use of HC smoke have been reported.

Toxicity 
Hexachloroethane is not particularly toxic when taken orally, but is considered to be quite toxic by skin adsorption.  The primary effect is depression of the central nervous system.  The concentration that is immediately dangerous to life or health is 300 ppm and the permissible exposure limit according to the Occupational Safety and Health Administration is 1 ppm (skin).  It is reasonably anticipated to be a carcinogen.

References

External links
 US Government Agency for Toxic Substances and Disease Registry ToxFAQs for Hexachloroethane
 US CDC NIOSH Pocket Guide to Chemical Hazards
 Scorecard.org chemical profile
 US EPA Hexachloroethane fact sheet

Chloroalkanes
IARC Group 2B carcinogens